"Troubadour" is a song written by Leslie Satcher and Monty Holmes, and recorded by American country music singer George Strait.  It was released in June 2008 as the second single and title track from his album Troubadour.  The song was the 86th chart single of his career.  It has become his 79th Top Ten single on the Billboard Hot Country Songs chart. "Troubadour" was nominated for Best Male Country Vocal Performance at the 2009 Grammy Awards.  Vince Gill sings background vocals on the single.

Content
The song is a ballad in which the narrator reflects on his life as a troubadour, feeling that he is content with what he has accomplished ("I was a young troubadour when I rode in on a song / I'll be an old troubadour when I'm gone").

Commercial performance
The song reached No. 7 on Billboard's Hot Country Songs and Country Airplay for the chart dated September 27, 2008. The song was certified Platinum by the RIAA on July 15, 2022, and has sold 949,000 copies in the United States as of November 2016.

Music video
In August 2008, Strait released a music video for the song. Directed by Trey Fanjoy, and edited by Scott Mele, the song's video alternates between footage of him singing, and shots of archived photos from various points in his career. This is his first music video since 2006's "The Seashores of Old Mexico", which Fanjoy also directed.

Chart history

Year-end charts

Certifications

References

2008 singles
2008 songs
George Strait songs
Songs written by Leslie Satcher
Songs written by Monty Holmes
Music videos directed by Trey Fanjoy
Song recordings produced by Tony Brown (record producer)
MCA Nashville Records singles